

This is a list of the National Register of Historic Places listings in Wayne County, Pennsylvania.

This is intended to be a complete list of the properties and districts on the National Register of Historic Places in Wayne County, Pennsylvania, United States. The locations of National Register properties and districts for which the latitude and longitude coordinates are included below, may be seen in a map.

There are 17 properties and districts listed on the National Register in the county. One site is further designated as a National Historic Landmark.

Current listings

|}

Former listing

|}

See also

 List of Pennsylvania state historical markers in Wayne County

References

 
Wayne County